The fourth season of American Dad! was originally shown in the United States from September 30, 2007, to May 18, 2008. 

The season consisted of sixteen episodes. The first half of the season is included within the Volume Three DVD box set, which was released on April 15, 2008, and the second half is included within the Volume Four DVD box set, which was released on April 28, 2009. The fourth season consisted of one 2AJNxx holdover episode while the remaining episodes of the season were from 3AJNxx production line.

This is the final season that composer Ron Jones worked for the score before leaving the show to work on the music for Family Guy until season 12. He was later replaced by Joel McNeely, who frequently collaborated with MacFarlane and worked on the series' musical score, along with Walter Murphy, ever since.

Because of the 2007–2008 Writers Guild of America strike, there was a shortage of episodes this season. Much like season 6 of Family Guy, the episodes that were shown during the WGA strike were done so without permission from Seth MacFarlane, since MacFarlane showed support for the writers by not finishing any planned episodes until the strike ended.


Episode list

Reception
The season was nominated for a Teen Choice Award. 

Reviews were mostly positive.

References
General
 

Specific

2007 American television seasons
2008 American television seasons